Johnnie Harris (born August 21, 1972) is a former American football Safety. He played in the Arena Football League (AFL) for the Tampa Bay Storm (1996–1998), Orlando Predators (2005), Grand Rapids Rampage (2006–2007), Philadelphia Soul (2007) and Dallas Desperados (2008).  Harris also played in the National Football League as a safety for the Oakland Raiders (1999–2001) and the New York Giants (2000–2003).

Harris also played two seasons in the Canadian Football League (1996–1997) winning a Grey Cup championship both times. He played one with the San Antonio Texans (1995) and two with the Toronto Argonauts (1996-1997).

Harris was named the AFL Defensive Player of the Year and first-team All-Arena at defensive specialist in 1998 after he set single-season league records in interceptions (11) and passes defended (33) while playing for the Tampa Bay Storm. The Storm's quarterback, Jay Gruden, told his brother, Raiders head coach Jon Gruden, to take a look at Harris, leading to his start in the NFL with the Raiders.

References

External links
Johnnie Harris at ArenaFan Online

1972 births
Living people
American football safeties
American players of Canadian football
Canadian football defensive backs
Players of American football from Chicago
Players of Canadian football from Chicago
Mississippi State Bulldogs football players
San Antonio Texans players
Tampa Bay Storm players
Toronto Argonauts players
Oakland Raiders players
New York Giants players
Orlando Predators players
Grand Rapids Rampage players
Philadelphia Soul players
Dallas Desperados players